Callichirus is a genus of crustaceans belonging to the family Callianassidae. It was circumscribed by William Stimpson in 1866.

Species
The genus includes the following species:

 Callichirus adamas (Kensley, 1974)
 Callichirus balssi (Monod, 1933)
 Callichirus foresti Le Loeuff & Intes, 1974
 Callichirus gilchristi (Barnard, 1947)
 Callichirus guineensis (de Man, 1928)
 Callichirus islagrande (Schmitt, 1935)
 Callichirus kraussi (Stebbing, 1900)
 Callichirus major (Say, 1818)
 Callichirus masoomi (Tirmizi, 1970)
 Callichirus santarosaensis Sakai & Türkay, 2012
 Callichirus seilacheri (Bott, 1955)
 Callichirus tenuimanus de Saint Laurent & Le Loeuff, 1979

References

External links
 

Thalassinidea